Anticoryne is a genus of flowering plants belonging to the family Myrtaceae.

Its native range is Southwestern Australia.

Species:

Anticoryne diosmoides 
Anticoryne melanosperma 
Anticoryne ovalifolia

References

 
Myrtaceae genera